Letea Forest is the oldest natural reservation in Romania. It was established in 1938, when the Romanian Council of Ministers passed Decision No. 645 declaring the forest a nature reserve. It is located between the Sulina and Chilia branches of Danube in the Danube Delta.

This forest was the initial foundation of the Danube Delta Biosphere Reserve, which has been declared a World Heritage Site. It was internationally recognized as a Biosphere Reserve under UNESCO's Man and the Biosphere Programme in 1992.

It has a subtropical aspect, due to the presence of the tropical creeper named Periploca graeca. This is a Mediterranean plant which finds its most northern refuge in the Danube Delta. Along with this, types of liana and other climbing plants are woven on the branches of the trees, such as the wild vine, common hop and the ivy.

Letea Forest is formed mainly from trees like white poplar, black poplar, elm tree, English oak, silver lime, narrow-leafed ash and common alder. Along with those above, it is completed by a great diversity of sub-shrub species.

It is also home to a rich faunal assemblage, including the red-footed falcon, the white-tailed eagle, the roller, the hoopoe, the Vipera ursinii and the Danube Delta horse. There are approximately 1600 insect species identified from the reservation.

Ukraine will destroy the Danube Delta (including the Letea forest) by constructing the new Bystroye Canal.

References

External links 
Danube Delta - Letea Forest
 Danube Delta Attractions
Danube Delta Biosphere Reserve - UNESCO World Heritage Center

1938 establishments in Romania
National parks of Romania
Tourist attractions in Tulcea County
Flora of Romania
Nature reserves in Romania
Geography of Tulcea County